Theridiosoma is a genus of ray spiders that was first described by Octavius Pickard-Cambridge in 1879. They use their web as a high speed slingshot to actively hunt for prey.

Description 
Mature spiders in this genus have a body length of 0.5–2.5 mm. The carapace ranges from dark brown to light tan, sometimes with distinct markings around the eye region or fovea, The sternum is smooth, with sparse bristles, and is usually darker towards the margin. A pit organ is present on the anterior margin of the sternum, at both corners. The abdomen is ovoid in shape, and taller than wide or long; the dorsal side of the abdomen often bears a light, thin median band and/or symmetrical light spots, the ventral side is dark. The metatarsi of the legs are typically shorter than the tibiae. As with other spiders in the family, the tibiae of the 3rd and 4th legs bear a group of long, vibration-sensitive trichobothria. Species in this genus exhibit only slight sexual dimorphism; males are similar to females in colouration but are slightly smaller, with proportionally longer legs.

The eyes are all approximately equal in size. The PME are very close together, sometimes touching, separated by less than half their diameter. The AME are also close together, but are typically separated by around half their diameter.

Distribution and habitat 
This genus is found throughout the world. Their preferred habitat is typical for the family; they construct a web in wet, shaded understories of forests,

Behaviour 
All species construct a vertical orb web in dark, damp places. At the end of web construction, the radial threads are fused at the centre so that only four, the "rays", reach the hub. The spider's rear legs are used to hold these rays while the front legs hold onto an extra line of thread, which is used to pull the web into a cone and keep it under tension. When potential prey nears the web the spider releases the tension in the web, causing it to slam into the prey. The spider then bites the prey, and wraps it in silk. The speeds with which the spiders slingshot themselves is very high; speeds exceeding 4.1m/s with accelerations exceeding 1300m/s2 have been observed.

Species
 it contains thirty-three species, found in Oceania, Asia, Central America, Africa, South America, North America, Europe, and the Caribbean:
Theridiosoma ankas Dupérré & Tapia, 2017 – Ecuador
Theridiosoma argenteolunulatum Simon, 1897 – Caribbean, Venezuela
Theridiosoma blaisei Simon, 1903 – Gabon
Theridiosoma caaguara Rodrigues & Ott, 2005 – Brazil
Theridiosoma chiripa Rodrigues & Ott, 2005 – Brazil
Theridiosoma circuloargenteum Wunderlich, 1976 – Australia (New South Wales)
Theridiosoma concolor Keyserling, 1884 – Mexico, Brazil
Theridiosoma davisi Archer, 1953 – Mexico
Theridiosoma diwang Miller, Griswold & Yin, 2009 – China
Theridiosoma epeiroides Bösenberg & Strand, 1906 – Russia (Far East), Korea, Japan
Theridiosoma esmeraldas Dupérré & Tapia, 2017 – Ecuador
Theridiosoma fasciatum Workman, 1896 – Singapore, Indonesia (Sumatra)
Theridiosoma gemmosum (L. Koch, 1877) (type) – North America, Europe, Turkey, Caucasus, Iran, Japan
Theridiosoma genevensium (Brignoli, 1972) – Sri Lanka
Theridiosoma goodnightorum Archer, 1953 – Mexico to Costa Rica
Theridiosoma kikuyu Brignoli, 1979 – Kenya
Theridiosoma kullki Dupérré & Tapia, 2017 – Ecuador
Theridiosoma latebricola Locket, 1968 – Angola
Theridiosoma lopdelli Marples, 1955 – Samoa
Theridiosoma lucidum Simon, 1897 – Venezuela
Theridiosoma nebulosum Simon, 1901 – Malaysia
Theridiosoma nechodomae Petrunkevitch, 1930 – Jamaica, Puerto Rico
Theridiosoma obscurum (Keyserling, 1886) – Brazil
Theridiosoma picteti Simon, 1893 – Indonesia (Sumatra)
Theridiosoma plumarium Zhao & Li, 2012 – China
Theridiosoma sacha Dupérré & Tapia, 2017 – Ecuador
Theridiosoma sancristobalensis Baert, 2014 – Ecuador (Galapagos Is.)
Theridiosoma savannum Chamberlin & Ivie, 1944 – USA
Theridiosoma shuangbi Miller, Griswold & Yin, 2009 – China
Theridiosoma taiwanica Zhang, Zhu & Tso, 2006 – Taiwan
Theridiosoma triumphale Zhao & Li, 2012 – China
Theridiosoma vimineum Zhao & Li, 2012 – China
Theridiosoma zygops (Chamberlin & Ivie, 1936) – Panama

Formerly included:
T. albonotatum Petrunkevitch, 1930 (Transferred to Baalzebub)
T. benoiti Roberts, 1978 (Transferred to Andasta)
T. brauni Wunderlich, 1976 (Transferred to Baalzebub)
T. fauna Simon, 1897 (Transferred to Naatlo)
T. nigrum (Keyserling, 1886) (Transferred to Wendilgarda)
T. semiargenteum (Simon, 1895) (Transferred to Andasta)
T. splendidum (Taczanowski, 1873) (Transferred to Naatlo)
T. sylvicola Hingston, 1932 (Transferred to Naatlo)

See also
 List of Theridiosomatidae species

References

Further reading

Araneomorphae genera
Cosmopolitan spiders
Taxa named by Octavius Pickard-Cambridge
Theridiosomatidae